Zaqhwan Zaidi (born 20 July 1995, in Selangor) is a Malaysian motorcycle racer. He currently rides in the MFJ All Japan Road Race JSB1000 Championship, aboard a Honda CBR1000RR and the Asia Road Race SS600 Championship, aboard a Honda CBR600RR. He was the 2014 and 2016 champion in the SS600 class of the Asia Road Racing Championship.

Career statistics

Grand Prix motorcycle racing

By season

Races by year

Supersport World Championship

Races by year
(key)

Asia Superbike 1000

Races by year
(key) (Races in bold indicate pole position; races in italics indicate fastest lap)

External links
Profile on MotoGP.com
Profile on WorldSBK.com
Tag Archive on GPMalaysia.com
Tag Archive on Fastlenz.My
Tag Archive on Sports247.My

1995 births
Living people
Malaysian motorcycle racers
Moto2 World Championship riders
Supersport World Championship riders
People from Selangor